Jimmy Snuggerud (born June 1, 2004) is an American collegiate ice hockey right wing for the University of Minnesota of the National Collegiate Athletic Association (NCAA). He was drafted 23rd overall by the St. Louis Blues in the 2022 NHL Entry Draft.

Playing career
Snuggerud spent two seasons with the USA Hockey National Team Development Program. During the 2021–22 season, he recorded 24 goals and 39 assists in 59 games. Snuggerud competed at the 2022 BioSteel All-American Game.

Snuggerud is committed to play college ice hockey for the Minnesota Golden Gophers during the 2022–23 season. He was drafted 23rd overall by the St. Louis Blues in the 2022 NHL Entry Draft.

Personal life
Snuggerud's father, Dave, is a former professional ice hockey player, while his grandfather, James Westby, played for Team USA at the Men's World Championship. His cousin, Luc Snuggerud, is also a professional ice hockey player.

International play

Snuggerud represented the United States at the 2020 Winter Youth Olympics where he served as captain and recorded two assists in four games and won a silver medal.

Snuggerud represented the United States at the 2022 IIHF World U18 Championships, where he recorded three goals and four assists in six games and won a silver medal.

On December 12, 2022, Snuggerud was named to the United States men's national junior ice hockey team to compete at the 2023 World Junior Ice Hockey Championships. During the tournament he recorded five goals and eight assists in seven games and won a bronze medal.

Career statistics

Regular season and playoffs

International

Awards and honors

References

External links
 

2004 births
Living people
Ice hockey people from Minnesota
Ice hockey players at the 2020 Winter Youth Olympics
Minnesota Golden Gophers men's ice hockey players
National Hockey League first-round draft picks
People from Chaska, Minnesota
St. Louis Blues draft picks
USA Hockey National Team Development Program players
Youth Olympic silver medalists for the United States